Nithsdale Amateur Rowing Club is a rowing club on the River Nith, based at Nith Avenue, Dumfries, Dumfries and Galloway, Scotland. The club is affiliated to Scottish Rowing.

History
The club was founded in 1865 as the Nith Regatta Club but in 1890 the name was changed to its current name.

The club has produced multiple British champions.

Honours

British champions

References

Sport in Dumfries
Rowing clubs in Scotland